The Mellor Tucana (previously known as the Bluebird Tucana) is a small wheelchair-accessible minibus manufactured by Mellor Coachcraft in England.

Tucana
The Bluebird Tucana entered production in 2005 fitted to the Volkswagen Transporter T5 chassis. Over 650 were built, with Transport for London purchasing over 250 for use on Dial-a-Ride services. A number are also used by CT Plus on London commercial route 812 and by Sheffield Community Transport in South Yorkshire.

Woodall Nicholson purchased the rights to the Tucana and transferred production from Scarborough to its Mellor Coachcraft subsidiary in Rochdale after Bluebird entered administration in 2014.

Tucana II
In August 2016, Mellor Coachcraft launched the Mellor Tucana II based on the Volkswagen Transporter T6 chassis with the first delivered to Scarborough Dial-a-Ride.

Gallery

References

External links

Mellor Tucana brochure Mellor Coachcraft
Mellor Tucana II brochure Mellor Coachcraft

Minibuses
Mellor Coachcraft
Vehicles introduced in 2005